The following is a list of Supreme Court of Canada opinions written by Russell Brown during his tenure on the Court.

2016 
{| width=100%
|-
|
{| width=100% align=center cellpadding=0 cellspacing=0
|-
! bgcolor=#CCCCCC | 2016 statistics
|-
|

2017 
{| width=100%
|-
|
{| width=100% align=center cellpadding=0 cellspacing=0
|-
! bgcolor=#CCCCCC | 2017 statistics
|-
|

Brown